Global Citizen – EP 1 is the fourteenth extended play by British rock band Coldplay and their first release under the pseudonym Los Unidades. The project was made available worldwide on 30 November 2018 featuring production by Rik Simpson and musical guests including Pharrell Williams, David Guetta, Stargate and others.

It was released as part of the lead-up to the group's performance at the "Mandela 100" Global Citizen Festival, which happened on 2 December 2018, in South Africa. All proceeds from the EP were donated to Global Citizen, an international education and advocacy organization working to catalyze the movement to end extreme poverty.

Background
The trademark Los Unidades was filed by Coldplay in late 2017.

Track listing 
Coldplay's songwriting members are Guy Berryman, Jonny Buckland, Will Champion and Chris Martin.

Personnel
Credits are adapted from Global Citizen – EP 1 liner notes.

Los Unidades
Chris Martin – lead vocals, keyboards, acoustic guitar 
Jonny Buckland – electric guitar 
Guy Berryman – bass guitar 
Will Champion – drums, drum pad, percussion, backing vocals 

Additional musicians
Stargate 
Nelson Mandela – backing vocals 
Pharrell Williams – backing vocals 
Jozzy – vocals 
Cassper Nyovest – vocals 
Stormzy – vocals 
Jess Kent – vocals 
Tiwa Savage – backing vocals 
WizKid – vocals 
Danny Ocean – vocals 
David Guetta – backing vocals 

Production
Coldplay – executive production
Stargate – production
Rik Simpson – production
Mike Larson – production
Daniel Green – production
Bill Rahko – production

References

2018 EPs
Coldplay EPs
Albums produced by Rik Simpson
Parlophone EPs